Peter Maris is a film director, producer and editor and has over 30 films to his credit. He has also connected with SAGIndie and the Fresno Film Commission.

Background
Maris was born in Greece and has lived in California for many years. At present he lives in Fresno.

Film work
Among his early work was the cult film Delirium in 1979 that starred Turk Cekovsky and Barron Winchester. In 1988 he directed Terror Squad.

Filmography

Director
 Zombie Hunters - 2007
 The Survivor - 2006
 Finish Line: A Cruise Down Memory Lane - 2005
 Warpath - 2000
 Alien Species - 1996
 The Killer Inside - 1996
 Phantasmagoria - 1995 (video game)
 Can It Be Love - 1992
 Diplomatic Immunity - 1991
 Hangfire - 1991
 Ministry of Vengeance - 1989
 Viper - 1988
 Terror Squad - 1988
 Land of Doom - 1986
 Curse of the Red Butterfly - 1982
 Delirium - 1979

References

External links
 marisentertainment.com/ Maris Entertainment website
 
 Peter Maris MGM Channel

Living people
American film directors
Year of birth missing (living people)